The white-eyed parakeet or white-eyed conure (Psittacara leucophthalmus) is a small green Neotropical parrot native to South America.

Taxonomy
First described by German zoologist Philipp Ludwig Statius Müller in 1776, its specific epithet is derived from the Ancient Greek leukos "white" and ophthalmos "eye".

Dickinson (2003) recognised three subspecies: Aratinga leucophthalma nicefori, A. l. callogenys, and A. l. leucophthalma.

Description

The underwing primary coverts are red tipped yellow. A prominent white eye ring gives this species its name. In addition to the nominate, there are two very similar subspecies, callogenys and nicefori, although the validity of the latter, based on a single specimen, is questionable. Juveniles have little or no red and yellow in their plumage.

Distribution and habitat
White-eyed parakeets are found over much of northern South America, from eastern Venezuela, Trinidad, Colombia and the Guianas in the north across Brazil to Argentina and Uruguay in forests, woodland, savanna and mangroves. Adapts readily to degraded and urban areas, provided there are sources of food and nesting places (under roofs and other cavities) and occurs in several cities.

Conservation status
The species is listed under CITES Appendix II.  It is rated as least concern on the IUCN Red List.  According to the IUCN, this bird has been heavily trafficked since 1981.

Aviculture
Though not as popular as some of the more colorful parakeets, the white-eyed parakeet can become a sweet, loving and talkative pet. They are seldom destructive and are generally not screamers, often choosing to mimic speech instead. Although many breeders ignore this species, those that do breed them appreciate their good parenting skills. Breeding requirements for white-eyed parakeets are much the same as for other parakeet species.

They will usually start to go to nest in March or April, sometimes breeding throughout the year and having four to six clutches. The clutch size is usually four eggs. Chicks will sometimes start to talk by the time they are weaned and generally will talk by six months of age.

White-eyed parakeets are sometimes confused with Finsch's parakeets because both have the red and yellow epaulets under their wings. The white-eyed parakeets lack the red triangle on the forehead as adults. In captivity they can live for 25-30 years.

References

External links

White-eyed parakeet videos on the Internet Bird Collection
Stamps (for French Guiana, Paraguay) with ~RangeMap

white-eyed parakeet
Animal intelligence
Birds of South America
Birds of the Guianas
white-eyed parakeet
white-eyed parakeet
Species endangered by the pet trade